Dorny Romero (born 24 January 1998) is a Dominican professional footballer who plays as a forward for Bolivian club Always Ready and the Dominican Republic national team.

Early life
Dorny Romero was born in Santo Domingo on 4 September 1995.
He lived in El Seibo and studied at Sergio A. Beras High School. He began playing football at age 14 at Jean Anubi Football School. Although he had first aspired to be a baseball player, Romero developed a passion for football and pursued it professionally.

Career
Romero signed his first professional contract with Delfines del Este FC in 2017 and within that same season, he signed with Cibao FC. He played two friendly games against Cuba, putting in outstanding performances and scoring both winning goals.

Romero made his professional debut for the Dominican Republic national football team in a 1-0 friendly win over Guadeloupe on 15 February 2019. He wore the Cibao shirt until the summer of 2020, when he played the first phase of the Caribbean Club Championship in Jamaica, a tournament that gives access to the most important cups on the continent such as the CONCACAF Champions League and the CONCACAF League.

On 4 September 2020, the striker was announced by Venados of the Mexican soccer Liga de Ascenso, as his new acquisition to reinforce the attack of the entire state of Yucatán. Romero signed a two-year contract with the option of a third with the Mexican squad.

International goals
Scores and results list the Dominican Republic's goal tally first.

References

External links
 Cibao FC Profile
 Dorny Romero stats on Soccerway
 

1998 births
Living people
People from El Seibo Province
Dominican Republic footballers
Association football forwards
Dominican Republic international footballers
Dominican Republic expatriate footballers
Dominican Republic expatriate sportspeople in Mexico
Expatriate footballers in Mexico
Dominican Republic expatriate sportspeople in Bolivia
Expatriate footballers in Bolivia
Liga Dominicana de Fútbol players
Liga de Expansión MX players
Bolivian Primera División players
Delfines del Este FC players
Cibao FC players
Venados F.C. players
Real Santa Cruz players
Club Always Ready players